(English: Blessed are the dead) is the incipit of a verse from the Bible frequently used in funeral music of German-speaking composers.

The text appears in Revelation 14:13. In the Luther Bible it begins , in English "Blessed are the dead, who die in the Lord, from henceforth".

Other settings include those by Hugo Distler, Johann Hermann Schein, Gottfried Scheidt, Karl Piutti, Carl Philipp Emanuel Bach, Georg Philipp Telemann and Felix Mendelssohn-Bartholdy (op. 115 n. 1). Johann Sebastian Bach used the verse in a recitative of his cantata ''.

External links 

Choral compositions